Hargett is a surname. Notable people with the surname include:

 Cecil Hargett, American politician
 Edd Hargett (born 1947), American football player
 Peter L. Hargett (1852–1927), American politician and businessman
 Tre Hargett (born 1969), American politician

See also
 Harnett